Notocelia cynosbatella is a moth of the family Tortricidae. It is found from Europe to eastern Russia, it is also found in Asia Minor, Iran, Kazakhstan, China and Mongolia.

The wingspan is 16–22 mm. The forewings are grey at the base, the distal half is mostly white, but slightly grey-brown at the tip. The labial palpi have long yellow hairs. 

Adults are on wing in May and June.

The larvae feed on Rosa and occasionally also on Rubus, Pyrus, Malus, Prunus, Cydonia, Myrica, Carpinus and Quercus. The larvae damage cultivated roses, feeding in the flower buds and young shoots or between two spun leaves. There is only little damage to the foliage, but infested shoots can be distorted and flower buds destroyed.

References

External links
Eurasian Tortricidae 

Eucosmini
Moths of Europe
Insects of Turkey
Moths described in 1758
Taxa named by Carl Linnaeus